"Still Burnin' for You" is a song written and recorded by American country music artist Rob Crosby.  It was released in August 1991 as the third single from the album Solid Ground.  The song reached number 20 on the Billboard Hot Country Singles & Tracks chart.

Chart performance

References

1991 singles
1990 songs
Rob Crosby songs
Songs written by Rob Crosby
Song recordings produced by Scott Hendricks
Arista Nashville singles